Zirab (also Romanized as Zīr Āb) is a city in 
Savadkuh County, Mazandaran Province, Iran.

It is located in the Alborz (Elburz) mountain range.

At the 2006 census, its population was 18,216, in 4,764 families.

References

Cities in Mazandaran Province

Settled areas of Elburz